Amamiichthys matsubarai also known as the hoshierenko is a species of fish in the family Sparidae found only in Amami Island, Ryukyu Islands in Japan. This species is the only known member of the genus Amamiichthys.

References

Sparidae
Monotypic marine fish genera